The 2022 European Triathlon Championships was held from 12 to 14 August 2022 in Munich, Germany. Event was part of 2022 European Championships multi event.

Medal table

Medallists

Participating countries 

 World Triathlon (1)

References

External links
Official website
Results book

European Triathlon Championships
European Championships
European Triathlon Championships
Sports competitions in Munich
2022 European Championships
European Triathlon Championships